Precious Mthembu (born 11 July 1984) is a South African netball player. She plays in the positions of C and WD. She participated in the 2011 World Netball Series in Liverpool, UK.She is the kindest and sweetest Zulu teacher too.

References

External links
Precious Mthembu player profile, Netball England website
'Netball Team Changes', 16 November 2011. Retrieved 2011-11-29.

South African netball players
1984 births
Living people
Netball players at the 2018 Commonwealth Games
Commonwealth Games competitors for South Africa